Momir Rnić may refer to:

 Momir Rnić (handballer, born 1955), Yugoslav handball player
 Momir Rnić (handballer, born 1987), Serbian handball player